This is a list of current world boxing champions. Since at least John L. Sullivan, in the late 19th century, there have been world champions in professional boxing. The first of the current organizations to award a world title was the World Boxing Association (WBA), then known as the National Boxing Association (NBA), when it sanctioned its first title fight in 1921 between Jack Dempsey and Georges Carpentier for the world heavyweight championship.

There are now four major sanctioning bodies in professional boxing. The official rules and regulations of the World Boxing Association (WBA), World Boxing Council (WBC), International Boxing Federation (IBF), and World Boxing Organization (WBO) all recognize each other in their rankings and title unification rules. Each of these organizations sanction and regulate championship bouts and award world titles. American boxing magazine The Ring began awarding world titles in 1922.

There are eighteen weight divisions. To compete in a division, a boxer's weight must not exceed the upper limit. Manny Pacquiao has won world championships in eight weight divisions, more than any other boxer, and is the only one in boxing history to achieve it. The Klitschko brothers, Vitali and Wladimir, held all four major titles in the heavyweight division from 2011 to 2013; they were the first brothers to hold versions of the heavyweight championship at the same time.

Championships
When a champion, for reasons beyond his control such as an illness or injury, is unable to defend his title within the normal mandatory time, the sanctioning bodies may order an interim title bout and award the winner an interim championship. The WBA and WBC have often changed the status of their inactive champions to a "Champion in Recess" or "Champion Emeritus".

World Boxing Association
The World Boxing Association (WBA) was founded in 1921 as the National Boxing Association (NBA), a national regulating body of the United States. On August 23, 1962, the NBA became the WBA, which today has its head office in Panama. According to WBA championship rules, when a champion also holds a title of one of the other three major sanctioning bodies in an equivalent weight division, that boxer is granted a special recognition of "Unified Champion", and is given more time between mandatory title defences. The WBA Championships Committee and President may also designate a champion as a "Super Champion" or "Undisputed Champion" in exceptional circumstances; the standard WBA title is then vacated and contested between WBA-ranked contenders. When a WBA "Regular Champion" makes between five and ten successful defences, he may be granted the WBA "Super" title upon discretion of a vote of the WBA's board of governors.

World Boxing Council
The World Boxing Council (WBC) was founded in Mexico City, Mexico on February 14, 1963 in order to establish an international regulating body. The WBC established many of today's safety measures in boxing, such as the standing eight count, a limit of 12 rounds instead of 15, and additional weight divisions. More information about the WBC's other titles including "Silver", "Diamond", "Emeritus", "Franchise", "Honorary", and "Supreme Champion" can be read at the WBC article.

International Boxing Federation
The International Boxing Federation (IBF) originated in September 1976 as the United States Boxing Association (USBA) when American members of the WBA withdrew in order to legitimize boxing in the United States with "unbiased" ratings. In April 1983, the organization established an international division that was known as the United States Boxing Association-International (USBA-I). In May 1984, the New Jersey-based USBA-I was renamed and became the IBF.

World Boxing Organization
The World Boxing Organization (WBO) was founded in San Juan, Puerto Rico (which is a self-governing commonwealth of the United States) in 1988. In its early years the WBO's titles were not widely recognized. By 2012 when the Japan Boxing Commission officially recognized the governing body, it had gained similar status to the other three major sanctioning bodies. Its motto is "dignity, democracy, honesty." When a WBO champion has reached "preeminent status", the WBO's Executive Committee may designate him as a "Super Champion". However, this is only an honorary title and not the same as the WBA's policy of having separate "Super" and "Regular" champions. A WBO "Super Champion" cannot win or lose that recognition in the ring; it is merely awarded by the WBO.

The Ring
The boxing magazine The Ring awards its own belts. The original title sequence began from the magazine's first publication in the 1920s until its titles were placed on hiatus in 1989, continuing as late as 1992 in some divisions. When The Ring started awarding titles again in 2001, it did not calculate retrospective lineages to fill in the gap years, instead nominating a new champion.

In 2007, The Ring was acquired by the owners of fight promoter Golden Boy Promotions, which has publicized The Ring'''s world championships when they are at stake in fights it promotes (such as Joe Calzaghe vs. Roy Jones Jr. in 2008). Since 2012, to reduce the number of vacant titles, The Ring allows fights between a number one or two contender; or alternatively a number three, four, or five contender to fill a vacant title. This has prompted further doubts about its credibility.The Horrible New Ring Magazine Championship Policy – Queensberry Rules  Some boxing journalists have been extremely critical of the new championship policy and state that if this new policy is followed, the Ring'' title may lose the credibility it once held.

Current champions
The current champions in each weight division are listed below. Each champion's professional boxing record is shown in the following format: wins–losses–draws–no contests (knockout wins).

Heavyweight (+200 lb/+90.7 kg or +224 lb/+101.6 kg)

| style="text-align:center;"|Oleksandr Usyk20–0 (13 KO)September 25, 2021
| rowspan="2" style="text-align:center;"|Tyson Fury33–0–1 (24 KO)February 22, 2020
| rowspan="2" style="text-align:center;"|Oleksandr Usyk20–0 (13 KO)September 25, 2021
| style="text-align:center;"|Oleksandr Usyk20–0 (13 KO)September 25, 2021
| rowspan="2" style="text-align:center;"|Oleksandr Usyk20–0 (13 KO)August 20, 2022
|-
| style="text-align:center;"|Daniel Dubois18–1 (17 KO)June 11, 2022
| style="text-align:center;"|Joe Joyce15–0 (14 KO)September 24, 2022
|-

Bridgerweight (224 lb/101.6 kg)

| style="text-align:center;"|vacant

Cruiserweight/Junior heavyweight (200 lb/90.7 kg or 190 lb/86.2 kg)

| style="text-align:center;"|Arsen Goulamirian27–0 (18 KO)August 31, 2019
| style="text-align:center;" style="text-align:center;"|Badou Jack28–3–3 (16 KO)February 26, 2023
| style="text-align:center;"|Jai Opetaia22–0 (17 KO)July 2, 2022
| style="text-align:center;"|Lawrence Okolie18–0 (14 KO)March 20, 2021
| style="text-align:center;"|Jai Opetaia22–0 (17 KO)July 2, 2022
|-

Light heavyweight (175 lb/79.9 kg)

| style="text-align:center;"|Dmitry Bivol21–0 (11 KO)September 23, 2017
| style="text-align:center;"|Artur Beterbiev19–0 (19 KO)October 18, 2019
| style="text-align:center;"|Artur Beterbiev19–0 (19 KO)November 11, 2017
| style="text-align:center;"|Artur Beterbiev19–0 (19 KO)June 18, 2022
| style="text-align:center;"|vacant

Super middleweight (168 lb/76.2 kg)

| style="text-align:center;"|Canelo Álvarez58–2–2 (39 KO)December 19, 2020
| style="text-align:center;"|Canelo Álvarez58–2–2 (39 KO)December 19, 2020
| rowspan="2" style="text-align:center;"|Canelo Álvarez58–2–2 (39 KO)November 6, 2021
| style="text-align:center;"|Canelo Álvarez58–2–2 (39 KO)May 8, 2021
|  rowspan="2" style="text-align:center;"|Canelo Álvarez58–2–2 (39 KO)December 19, 2020
|-
| style="text-align:center;"|David Morrell8–0 (7 KO)January 19, 2021
| style="text-align:center;"|David Benavidez26–0 (23 KO)May 21, 2022
| style="text-align:center;"|John Ryder32–5 (18 KO)November 26, 2022

Middleweight (160 lb/72.6 kg)

| rowspan="2" style="text-align:center;"|Erislandy Lara29–3–3 (17 KO)May 1, 2021
| style="text-align:center;"|Jermall Charlo32–0 (22 KO)June 26, 2019
| rowspan="2" style="text-align:center;"|vacant
| rowspan="2" style="text-align:center;"|Janibek Alimkhanuly13–0 (8 KO)August 26, 2022
| rowspan="2" style="text-align:center;"|vacant
|-
| style="text-align:center;"|Carlos Adames22–1 (17 KO)October 8, 2022

Super welterweight/Junior middleweight (154 lb/69.9 kg)

| rowspan="2" style="text-align:center;|Jermell Charlo35–1–1 (19 KO)September 26, 2020
| style="text-align:center;"|Jermell Charlo35–1–1 (19 KO)December 21, 2019
| rowspan="2" style="text-align:center;"|Jermell Charlo35–1–1 (19 KO) September 26, 2020
| style="text-align:center;"|Jermell Charlo35–1–1 (19 KO) May 14, 2022
| rowspan="2" style="text-align:center;"|Jermell Charlo35–1–1 (19 KO)September 26, 2020
|-
| style="text-align:center;"|Sebastian Fundora20–0–1 (13 KO)April 9, 2022
| style="text-align:center;"|Tim Tszyu22–0 (16 KO)March 12, 2023

Welterweight (147 lb/66.7 kg)

| style="text-align:center;"style="text-align:center;"|Errol Spence Jr.28–0 (22 KO)April 16, 2022
| rowspan="2" style="text-align:center;"|Errol Spence Jr.28–0 (22 KO)September 28, 2019
| style="text-align:center;"|Errol Spence Jr.28–0 (22 KO)May 27, 2017
| rowspan="2" style="text-align:center;"|Terence Crawford39–0 (30 KO)June 9, 2018
| rowspan="2" style="text-align:center;"|vacant
|-
| style="text-align:center;"|Eimantas Stanionis14–0–0–1 (9 KO)April 16, 2022
| style="text-align:center;"|Jaron Ennis30–0–0–1 (27 KO)January 7, 2023

Super lightweight/Junior welterweight (140 lb/63.5 kg)

| style="text-align:center;"|Alberto Puello21–0 (10 KO)August 20, 2022
| style="text-align:center;"|Regis Prograis28–1 (24 KO)November 26, 2022
| style="text-align:center;"|Subriel Matías19–1 (19 KO)February 25, 2023
| style="text-align:center;"|Josh Taylor19–0 (13 KO)May 22, 2021
| style="text-align:center;"|Josh Taylor19–0 (13 KO)October 26, 2019

Lightweight (135 lb/61.2 kg)

| style="text-align:center;"|Devin Haney29–0 (15 KO)June 4, 2022
| rowspan="2" style="text-align:center;"|Devin Haney29–0 (15 KO)October 23, 2019
| rowspan="2" style="text-align:center;"|Devin Haney29–0 (15 KO)June 4, 2022
| rowspan="2" style="text-align:center;"|Devin Haney29–0 (15 KO)June 4, 2022
| rowspan="2" style="text-align:center;"|Devin Haney29–0 (15 KO)June 4, 2022
|-
| style="text-align:center;"|Gervonta Davis28–0 (26 KO)December 28, 2019

Super featherweight/Junior lightweight (130 lb/59 kg)

| style="text-align:center;"|Héctor García16–1 (10 KO)August 20, 2022
| style="text-align:center;"|O'Shaquie Foster20–2 (11 KO)February 11, 2023
| style="text-align:center;"|Shavkat Rakhimov17–0–1 (14 KO)November 5, 2022
| style="text-align:center;"|Emanuel Navarrete37–1 (31 KO)February 3, 2023
| style="text-align:center;"|vacant

Featherweight (126 lb/57.2 kg)

| rowspan="2" style="text-align:center;"|Mauricio Lara26–2–1 (19 KO)February 18, 2023
| style="text-align:center;"|Rey Vargas36–1 (22 KO)July 9, 2022
| rowspan="2" style="text-align:center;"|Luis Alberto Lopez27–2 (15 KO)December 10, 2022
| rowspan="2" style="text-align:center;"|vacant
| rowspan="2" style="text-align:center;"|vacant
|-
| style="text-align:center;"|Brandon Figueroa24–1–1 (18 KO)March 4, 2023

Super bantamweight/Junior featherweight (122 lb/55.3 kg)

| style="text-align:center;"|Murodjon Akhmadaliev11–0 (8 KO)January 30, 2020
| style="text-align:center;"|Stephen Fulton21–0 (8 KO)November 27, 2021
| style="text-align:center;"|Murodjon Akhmadaliev11–0 (8 KO)January 30, 2020
| style="text-align:center;"|Stephen Fulton21–0 (8 KO)January 23, 2021
| style="text-align:center;"|vacant

Bantamweight (118 lb/53.5 kg)

| style="text-align:center;"|vacant
| style="text-align:center;"|vacant
| style="text-align:center;"|vacant
| style="text-align:center;"|vacant
| style="text-align:center;"|vacant

Super flyweight/Junior bantamweight (115 lb/52.2 kg)

| style="text-align:center;"|Joshua Franco18–1–3–1 (8 KO)June 23, 2020
| style="text-align:center;"|Juan Francisco Estrada44–3 (28 KO)December 3, 2022
|  style="text-align:center;"|Fernando Martínez 15–0 (8 KO)February 26, 2022
|style="text-align:center;"|vacant
| style="text-align:center;"|Juan Francisco Estrada44–3 (28 KO)April 26, 2019

Flyweight (112 lb/50.8 kg)

| rowspan="2" style="text-align:center;"|Artem Dalakian22–0 (15 KO)February 24, 2018
| style="text-align:center;"|Julio Cesar Martinez19–2–0–2 (14 KO)December 20, 2019
| rowspan="2" style="text-align:center;"|Sunny Edwards19–0 (4 KO)April 30, 2021
| rowspan="2" style="text-align:center;"|vacant
| rowspan="2" style="text-align:center;"|vacant
|-
| style="text-align:center;"|McWilliams Arroyo21–4–0–1 (16 KO)February 27, 2021

Light flyweight/Junior flyweight (108 lb/49 kg)

| style="text-align:center;"|Kenshiro Teraji 20–1 (12 KO)November 1, 2022
| style="text-align:center;"|Kenshiro Teraji20–1 (12 KO)March 19, 2022
| style="text-align:center;"|Sivenathi Nontshinga11–0 (9 KO)September 3, 2022
| style="text-align:center;"|Jonathan González27–3–1–1 (14 KO)October 17, 2021
| style="text-align:center;"|Kenshiro Teraji20–1 (12 KO)November 1, 2022

Minimumweight/Mini flyweight/Strawweight (105 lb/47.6 kg)

| style="text-align:center;"|Knockout CP Freshmart23–0 (9 KO)June 29, 2016
| rowspan="2" style="text-align:center;"|Panya Pradabsri38–1 (23 KO)November 27, 2020
| rowspan="2" style="text-align:center;"|Daniel Valladares26–3–1–1 (15 KO)July 1, 2022
| rowspan="2" style="text-align:center;"|Melvin Jerusalem20–2 (12 KO)January 6, 2023
| rowspan="2" style="text-align:center;"|vacant
|-
| style="text-align:center;"|Erick Rosa5–0 (1 KO)December 21, 2021

See also

List of WBA world champions
List of WBC world champions
List of IBF world champions
List of WBO world champions
List of The Ring world champions
List of current female world boxing champions
List of undefeated world boxing champions (retired only)
List of undisputed world boxing champions
List of current boxing rankings

References

External links
Official list of current WBA champions
Official list of current WBC champions
Official list of current IBF champions
Official list of current WBO champions
Official list of current Ring magazine champions
List of current boxing champions at BoxRec

World champions, current